"Always on the Run" is a song by American rock musician Lenny Kravitz, released as the first single from his second album, Mama Said (1991). It features a contribution by Guns N' Roses guitarist Slash. Slash had written the music for the song with the original intention of releasing it on a Guns N' Roses studio album but since former drummer Steven Adler had difficulty playing the song, he saved it for this eventual collaboration with Kravitz.

On June 6, 1992, during Guns N' Roses's Use Your Illusion Tour stop in Paris, Kravitz joined the band onstage and played guitar and sang vocals for this track.

The song is included in the video game Guitar Hero: Aerosmith. It is also heard in the Adam Sandler film The Waterboy, as well as the film Go.

Background
Slash met up with Kravitz for a vodka fueled songwriting session directly after finishing his european tour. After the last date, he jumped on the concorde and flew from London to New York at nine in the morning. Kravitz recalled to Rolling Stone, "He had me get a gallon of vodka and a bag of ice and we went into the studio and bang, there it was. The two of us wrote and cut the tune. I played drums; he played guitar; Then I played my guitar, Bass and did vocals. I brought the horn players in and it was done. Then he got on a plane the next morning and went to LA. It was a wild day."

Critical reception
In an retrospective review, Carla Hay of AXS stated, "As the first single from his 1991 album, Mama Said, “Always on the Run” further established Kravitz as a powerhouse rocker who expertly blended retro influences with modern sounds." Pan-European magazine Music & Media wrote, "Kravitz has always been heavily influenced by '60s artists like Lennon and Hendrix, and this time it is James Brown's turn to play godfather, too. The song leans on a strong staccato rhythm guitar and a sharp horn section. Good grooves provided."

Chart performance
"Always on the Run" reached the top ten on the US Billboard Modern Rock Tracks chart, peaking at number eight.

Music video
The accompanying music video for "Always on the Run" was directed by Jesse Dylan. It consists of the performance of the song featuring Lenny Kravitz' band and Slash, filmed in black and white.

Track listing
"Always on the Run"
"Butterfly"
"Light Skin Girl from London"
"Always on the Run" (Instrumental)

Charts

Weekly charts

Year-end charts

Covers
"Always on the Run" has been covered by Mark Ronson in the track "On the Run", featuring Mos Def and M.O.P.

References

Lenny Kravitz songs
Slash (musician) songs
1991 singles
Song recordings produced by Lenny Kravitz
Songs written by Lenny Kravitz
Songs written by Slash (musician)
Virgin Records singles
1991 songs